The 1963 Western Kentucky football team represented Western Kentucky State College (now known as Western Kentucky University) during the 1963 NCAA College Division football season. The Hilltoppers were led by OVC Coach of the Year Nick Denes, won the Ohio Valley Conference championship, and finished the season undefeated. This team was one of the finest in school history and set a school record for victories. The roster included future National Football League (NFL) players John Mutchler, Dale Lindsey, Jim Burt, and Harold Chambers as well as future NFL coach Joe Bugel. Mutchler was named OVC Defensive Player of the Year.

The Hilltoppers earned a berth in the Tangerine Bowl, where they defeated the Coast Guard Academy 27-0. Western Kentucky quarterback Sharon Miller was named the game's most valuable player.  Mutchler, Chambers, Bugel, Jim Burt, Lindsey, and Bobby Westmoreland were named to the All-OVC team, while John Burt, Eddie Crum, Bob Gebhart, Sharon Miller, and Stan Napper were Honorable Mention.

Schedule

References

Western Kentucky
Western Kentucky Hilltoppers football seasons
Citrus Bowl champion seasons
Ohio Valley Conference football champion seasons
College football undefeated seasons
Western Kentucky Hilltoppers football